Bolshoy Gondyr is a rural locality (a selo) and the administrative center of Bolshegondryskoye Rural Settlement, Kuyedinsky District, Perm Krai, Russia. The population was 1,141 as of 2010. There are 20 streets.

Geography 
Bolshoy Gondyr is located 18 km southwest of Kuyeda (the district's administrative centre) by road. Verkh-Gondyr is the nearest rural locality.

References 

Rural localities in Kuyedinsky District